BJU International (or BJUI, formerly known as the British Journal of Urology) is a monthly peer-reviewed medical journal that was established in 1929. The editor-in-chief is Freddie Hamdy and the journal is published by Wiley-Blackwell. It covers research on all aspects of urology.

The Journal is wholly owned by BJU International charity. The charity is affiliated with many urological societies around the world and the Journal is an official journal for many of these associations.
British Association of Urological Surgeons (BAUS) – Official Journal
Caribbean Urological Association (CURA) – Official Journal
Hong Kong Urological Association (HKUA) – Official Journal and affiliated
Indonesian Urological Association – Affiliated 
International Alliance of Urolithiasis – Affiliated Journal
Investigative and Clinical Urology – Affiliated Journal
Irish Society of Urology (ISU) – Official Journal
Malaysian Urological Association – Affiliated
Myanmar Nephro-Urology Society – Affiliated
Sri Lankan Association of Urological Surgeons (SLAUS) – Affiliated and official international Journal
Swiss Continence Foundation – Official Journal
Urological Society of Australia and New Zealand (USANZ) – Affiliated and official Journal

Abstracting and indexing 
This journal is abstracted and indexed in:
Biological Abstracts
Chemical Abstracts Service
Current Contents
Excerpta Medica
Elsevier Biobase/Current Awareness in Biological Sciences
Index medicus/MEDLINE/PubMed
Science Citation Index

According to the Journal Citation Reports, the journal has a 2021 impact factor of 5.969, ranking it 15th out of 123 journals in the category "Urology & Nephrology".

See also
List of medical journals

References

External links

Urology journals
Wiley-Blackwell academic journals
Publications established in 1929
Monthly journals
English-language journals